Seacon Square is a large indoor shopping mall in Prawet, Bangkok. It was opened in 1994 in a ceremony presided over by Princess Maha Chakri Sirindhorn. The building is 500 metres long, making it one of the largest shopping malls in Thailand. It opens daily at 10:00am.

Facilities

Shopping 
 Robinson Department Store
 Tops
 B2S
 Officemate
 Power Buy
 Supersports
 Go! WOW
 Lotus's Prawet (Lotus's The first branch of Thailand) (Old Tesco Lotus)
 Food Court by Lotus's
 Don Don Donki
 Sports World

Restaurants
 There are many food courts and variety of restaurants throughout the shopping center.

Education
 Tutor Square

Leisure activities
 Yoyoland – Children's amusement park on top floor includes a roller coaster and log flume.
 Seacon Cineplex – 14-screen movie theater with "Gold Class" cinema. (Old Grand EGV Seacon Square move to Grand EGV Seacon Bangkae)
 Fitness First

Parking facilities
 The mall has a five-story parking garage in addition to an underground parking lot.

Nearby attractions
 DusitPrincess Srinagarindra – Four-star hotel run by the Dusit Thani Group, attached to Dusit Thani College
 Go-kart track – Host of most of the national championship kart races as well as several motorcycle races. Nearby are a handful of motorcycle tuning shops and radio remote control car shops and tracks. The track is now closed and re-developed into a car parking space.
 Paradise Park – A nearby shopping mall within walking distance.
 250 Yard driving range with par 3.
 The large Rod Fai night market is behind it (road to the right. Follow the crowds). Open Thursday to Sunday, 5pm to midnight. The market has a large antiques, old cars, etc. section as well as many food stalls, etc.

Bombing attempt
Seacon Square was a target in the 2006 Bangkok bombings on December 31, 2006. A bomb was found in a trash can near a gold shop on the mall's ground floor. The bomb was removed to the Basement 2 parking lot where it exploded without causing injuries.

See also
List of shopping malls in Bangkok
List of shopping malls in Thailand

References

External links
 Official website

Shopping malls established in 1994
Shopping malls in Bangkok
Prawet district
1994 establishments in Thailand